The Jefferson County Courthouse is the center of county government for Jefferson County, Arkansas. It is located in the Pine Bluff Commercial Historic District in Pine Bluff on the border between the Arkansas delta and Piney Woods.

History
Built in 1856, the building was largely destroyed by fire in 1976. However, the surviving portions of the building were incorporated into the restored structure. The courthouse was listed on the National Register of Historic Places within the Pine Bluff Commercial Historic District submittal in 2008.

See also
 Battle of Pine Bluff
 List of county courthouses in Arkansas
 National Register of Historic Places listings in Jefferson County, Arkansas

References

1856 establishments in Arkansas
American Civil War on the National Register of Historic Places
Battle of Pine Bluff
Buildings and structures in Pine Bluff, Arkansas
County courthouses in Arkansas
Courthouses on the National Register of Historic Places in Arkansas
Government buildings completed in 1856
Historic district contributing properties in Arkansas
National Register of Historic Places in Pine Bluff, Arkansas
Terminating vistas in the United States
Tourist attractions in Pine Bluff, Arkansas
Victorian architecture in Arkansas